The Police Act 1967 is the Act of Parliament governing which governs the constitution, control, employment, recruitment, funds, discipline, duties, and powers of the Royal Malaysia Police including Royal Malaysia Police Reserve and the Royal Malaysia Police Cadet Corps. It was first enacted in 1967 (Act 41 of 1967) and then revised in 1988 as Act 344 of 1988. To date, there have been several attempts of amendments for the Police Act to be more in line with the internationally accepted human rights practices.

History 

In June 2008, there was an attempt to amend the Section 27 which did not specify the criteria and guideline to the conditions needed for permits to hold public rallies to reflect international standards. The attempted amendment was in line with proposals by the Royal Commission to Enhance the Management and Operation of the Royal Malaysia Police. Home Minister Syed Hamid Syed Jaafar Albar said the ministry agreed that applications for public rally permits must be made nine days before the date of the event and that the decision be made in three days.

The Police Act has been a subject of argument as it, to certain extent, inhibits the freedom of assembly. Its allowance for the police to detain without warrant has been a constant watch by international human rights organisations. In the discussion of human rights, especially the freedom of assembly, the Police Act is often cited together with other acts such as Internal Security Act, Official Secrets Act and Public Order (Preservation) Ordinance (1958) of which some allow police detention without warrant.

Police duties 

It specifies the scope of the duties of the Royal Malaysia Police. In the Section 3 (3) of Police Act 1967 stipulates that the duties of the Royal Malaysia Police personnel are as follows:

 Apprehending all persons whom he is by law authorised to apprehend;
 Processing security intelligence;
 Conducting prosecutions;
 Giving assistance in the carrying out of any law relating to revenue, excise, sanitation, quarantine, immigration and registration;
 Giving assistance in the preservation of order in the ports, harbours and airports of Malaysia, and in enforcing maritime and port regulations;
 Executing summonses, subpoenas, warrants, commitments and other process lawfully issued by any competent authority;
 Exhibiting information;
 Protecting unclaimed and lost property and finding the owners thereof;
 Seizing stray animals and placing them in a public pound;
 Giving assistance in the protection of life and property;
 Protecting public property from loss or injury;
 Attending the criminal courts and, if specially ordered, the civil courts, and keeping order therein; and
 Escorting and guarding prisoners and other persons in the custody of the police.

Structure
The Police Act 1967, in its current form (24 August 2015), consists of 14 Parts containing 100 sections and 3 schedules (including 9 amendments).
 Part I: Preliminary
 Part II: Interpretation
 Part III: The Royal Malaysia Police
 Part IV: Extra Police Officers and Watch Constables
 Part V: Service outside Malaysia and Service of Police of Other Territories in Malaysia
 Part VI: Appointments, Service, etc.
 Part VII: Duties and Powers of Police Officers
 Part VIII: Royal Malaysia Police Volunteer Reserve
 Part IX: Auxiliary Police
 Part X: Royal Malaysia Police Reserve
 Part XI: Royal Malaysia Police Cadet Corps
 Part XII: Discipline
 Part XIII: Police Fund
 Part XIV: General
 Schedules

See also
 Police Act

References

External links
 Police Act 1967 

1967 in Malaysian law
Law enforcement in Malaysia
Human rights abuses in Malaysia
Malaysian federal legislation
Police legislation